Jemal Yimer Mekonnen (born 11 September 1996) is an Ethiopian long-distance runner.

He placed fourth at the 2017 IAAF World Cross Country Championships, and finished fifth at the 2017 World Championships in Athletics – Men's 10,000 metres.

Yimer won the 10,000 m title at the 2018 African Athletics Championships in Asaba, Nigeria, and placed third in the event at the 2019 African Games held in Rabat, Morocco.

He finished third at the 2021 Boston Marathon with a time of 2:10:38.

Personal bests
 10,000 metres – 26:54.39 (Hengelo 2019)
 10 kilometres – 27:50 (Atlanta, GA 2022)
 Half marathon – 58:33 (Valencia 2018) 
 Marathon – 2:08:58 (Boston, MA 2022) * not legal

References

External links

1996 births
Living people
Ethiopian male long-distance runners
World Athletics Championships athletes for Ethiopia
Athletes (track and field) at the 2019 African Games
African Games bronze medalists for Ethiopia
African Games medalists in athletics (track and field)
African Championships in Athletics winners
21st-century Ethiopian people